The Honorary Consulate of Portugal in Palm Coast was an ad honorem diplomatic mission of Portugal in Florida, United States. Based in Palm Coast, the honorary consulate had jurisdiction over the State of Florida. The first and only honorary consul was Caesar DePaço, from 2014 to 2020.

History
The honorary consulate was created on October 3, 2014, with the appointment of Portuguese businessman Caesar DePaço as the "Consul ad honorem of the Portuguese Republic in the State of Florida". The honorary consulate's premises were opened in April 2015. DePaço chose to refuse his stipend from the Portuguese Government and instead funded the honorary consulate entirely, as a gift to the Portuguese people.

In 2015, the honorary consulate received its first visit by the Secretary of State for the Portuguese Communities.

Since 2015, the honorary consulate has helped to organize the Portugal Day celebrations each year on Palm Coast. At the 2017 celebrations, the honorary consul raised the Portuguese flag at a government building, for the first time in the history of Florida.

In 2017, the honorary consulate received the first official visit of the Portuguese Ambassador in Washington, Domingos Fezas Vital, as well as a visit from parliamentarian Teresa Morais, former Minister of Culture.

The honorary consulate's 2018 celebrations of Portugal Day were attended by Secretary of the Assembly of the Republic Duarte Pacheco.

In 2018, DePaço was recognized and honored by Rick Scott, then-Governor of Florida, for his work with the Portuguese communities of Florida. 

The honorary consul met with Carlos A. Giménez, Mayor of Miami-Dade, in 2018, as part of the honorary consulate's outreach with the communities in the state of Florida.

In May 2020, DePaço resigned from his position of Honorary Consul.

List of honorary consuls

References

External links 
 

Palm Coast
Portugal
Portugal–United States relations